The Pilgrimage Play is a 1949 historical drama film directed by Frank Strayer, from an original screenplay by Arthur Pierson. It was adapted from the play by Christine Wetherill Stevenson. The film stars Nelson Leigh, Stephen Chase, and Leonard Penn.

Cast list
 Nelson Leigh as Jesus of Nazareth
 Stephen Chase as Simon called Peter
 Leonard Penn as Judas Iscariot
 Richard Hale as Pontius Pilate
 Tudor Owen as Nicodemus
 John Doucette as Lord Zadok
 Gene Cates as John the Beloved
 Earl Smith as Blind beggar
 Fiona O'Shiel as Mary Magdala
 Helen Wood as Mary Mother
 Crane Whitley as Longinus
 John Parrish as John the Baptist
 C. Montague Shaw as Caiaphas
 King Donovan as Salathiel
 Wendy Howard as Martha
 Helen Glover as Mary of Bethany
 Elizabeth Harrower as Woman of Samaria
 Dana Skolfield as James
 Bob Buzzell as Matthew
 Pix Miller as Phillip
 Charles Alvin Bell as Andrew
 J. Roger Wood as Thomas
 Charles Clark as Bartholomew
 George Navarro as James Alpheus
 Harry McKnight as Thaddeus
 Dan Quigg as Simon the Canaanite
 Bill Shaw as Scribe
 Paul McGuire as Malchus
 Ed Rees as Barak
 Sol Winet as Jacob Jehosephat
 Steve Cardwell as Augustus
 Adeline Johnston as Joanna
 Margaret Adams as Susanna
 Beverly Billman as Adultress
 Martha Cates as Rebecca
 Jean O'Malley as Rowena
 Tempe Pigott as Serving woman
 Rachel Foulger as Old patriarch's daughter
 William Milner as Man with child
 Geoffrey Alan as Lazarus

References

External links
 
 
 

1949 drama films
1949 films
American drama films
American black-and-white films
Films directed by Frank R. Strayer
1940s American films
1940s English-language films